Susuga La'aulialemalietoa Leuatea Polataivao Fosi Schmidt is a Samoan politician, businessman, Cabinet Minister, and former speaker and deputy speaker of the Samoan Parliament.  He is the Member of Parliament for the Gagaifomauga No. 3 constituency and is the founder and chairman of the Fa'atuatua i le Atua Samoa ua Tasi (F.A.S.T.) party.

Early life and political career
Schmidt is the son of former Government Minister and founding member of the Human Rights Protection Party (HRPP) Polataivao Fosi Schmidt. He was first elected to the Fono as a candidate for the HRPP in the March 2006 elections. From 2006 to 2011 he served as Deputy Speaker. He was re-elected at the 2011 election and served as Speaker from 2011 to 2016. He was again re-elected at the 2016 election and appointed to Cabinet as Minister of Agriculture, Fisheries and Scientific Research. He subsequently served as acting Prime Minister.

In August 2017, Schmidt resigned as Minister of Agriculture and Fisheries and remained Member of Parliament as he had a lengthy legal battle with HRPP MP Peseta Vaifou Tevaga. He was subsequently charged with more than a hundred counts of forgery and theft. He was acquitted of all charges in June 2020.

Departure from HRPP and by-election 

In May 2020 he was sacked from the HRPP by Prime Minister Tuila'epa Sa'ilele Malielegaoi after voting against proposed constitutional amendments. He subsequently announced he had resigned from the HRPP and that he would be forming a new political party to contest the 2021 election.

On 30 June 2020, the Parliamentary Privileges and Ethics Committee found that Schmidt had misled Parliament over the disputed price of a generator during a debate and recommended that he be suspended from Parliament for three months without pay. Schmidt apologised to the House and verbally resigned his seat. After some initial doubt, the verbal resignation was deemed to be effective, and a by-election was called.

On 30 July Schmidt registered the Faatuatua i le Atua Samoa ua Tasi (FAST) Party to contest in the 2021 Elections. He ran as a candidate for the party in the 2020 Gagaifomauga No. 3 byelection and was successfully re-elected.

Government
Schmidt was re-elected in the 2021 Samoan general election. On 24 May 2021 he was appointed Minister of Agriculture and Fisheries in the elected cabinet of Fiamē Naomi Mataʻafa. The appointment was disputed by the caretaker government. On 23 July 2021 the Court of Appeal ruled that the swearing-in ceremony was constitutional and binding, and that FAST had been the government since 24 May.

Notes

References 

|-

|-

|-

|-

|-

|-

Living people
Speakers of the Legislative Assembly of Samoa
Members of the Legislative Assembly of Samoa
People from Gaga'ifomauga
Human Rights Protection Party politicians
Faʻatuatua i le Atua Samoa ua Tasi politicians
Government ministers of Samoa
Year of birth missing (living people)